Dunn Glacier is a steep tributary glacier which drains the northwest slopes of Mount Casey and flows north to Icebreaker Glacier, in the Mountaineer Range, Victoria Land. It was mapped by the United States Geological Survey from surveys and from U.S. Navy air photos, 1960–64, and was named by the Advisory Committee on Antarctic Names for Robert Dunn, a U.S. Navy commissaryman at McMurdo Station, 1967.

See also 
 List of glaciers in the Antarctic

References 

Glaciers of Borchgrevink Coast